Badminton at the 1961 Southeast Asian Peninsular Games was held in Rangoon, Burma from 11 to 16 December in 1961. Five competitions were held in men's singles, men's doubles, women's singles, women's doubles and in mixed doubles.

Medalists

Final results

Medal table

References
https://eresources.nlb.gov.sg/newspapers/Digitised/Article/straitstimes19611217-1.2.52.4
https://eresources.nlb.gov.sg/newspapers/Digitised/Article/straitstimes19611220-1.2.123
https://eresources.nlb.gov.sg/newspapers/Digitised/Article/straitstimes19611214-1.2.139.6

1961 in badminton
Multi-sport events, Southeast Asian Games
1961
1961 in Burmese sport